"How I Got This Way" is a song by Australian rock band Taxiride. It was released as the second single from their second studio album, Garage Mahal, on 23 September 2002. It reached No. 28 in Australia.

Track listing
Australian CD single
 "How I Got This Way"
 "Alright"
 "Love the Sun"
 "How I Got This Way" (original demo)

Charts

References

2002 singles
Taxiride songs
Warner Music Group singles
2002 songs